Giovanni Angelo Del Maino (active in Pavia and the duchy of Milan 1496–1536; possibly born in Milan, c. 1475; date of death unknown) was an Italian sculptor in wood.

1475 births
Italian sculptors
Italian male sculptors
Italian woodcarvers
Year of death unknown